The Baltimore Terrapins were a professional baseball team based in Baltimore, Maryland, that played in the Federal League for two seasons in 1914 and 1915. The franchise used Terrapin Park as their home field. In 1914, the team finished third in the FL with a record of 84–70. In 1915, the team finished eighth with a record of 47–107.

Players

References

External links
Franchise index at Baseball-Reference and Retrosheet

Major League Baseball all-time rosters